Dramabeans is an English-language website that features in-depth reviews and analyses of Korean dramas, and also serves as a fan forum for those programs featured. It also features Korean entertainment news on such topics such as preproduction and casting.

History
Dramabeans began as a blog by Korean American "Sarah", better known by her online pen name of "javabeans" in 2007 as a site to recap and debate Korean dramas. As the popularity of the blog increased, she registered the domain name. In 2010, Dramabeans reader "Jen", better known as "girlfriday", became a second regular reviewer-contributor to the site, and the two were able to make the site their full-time job.

Methodology and impact
The core of the site is an archive of recaps of each episode of selected dramas, with comments serving as a forum on the episode reviewed. Most new miniseries from the big three (KBS, MBC and SBS) will receive a recap of the first episode, with those which the recappers find most interested in having every episode in its 16 to 24-episode run being reviewed, longer dramas are not covered. Both javabeans and girlfriday are professional writers and deconstruct each episode as both writers and as ethnic Koreans with an understanding of the Korean entertainment industry, Korean story telling tropes, and mores and customs. The popularity of Dramabeans has paralleled the growing popularity of Korean dramas as part of the Korean Wave in the West, serving as a primer to Korean mores, culture and attitudes to Western audiences.

The site also features articles regarding casting and preproduction of upcoming dramas, and behind-the-scenes news of airing dramas.

Awards and nominations

Publications

References

External links
Original javabeans blog

Entertainment Internet forums
Internet properties established in 2007